Keep the Change may refer to:

 Keep the Change (album), an album by ApologetiX
 Keep the Change, an album by Ralph Bowen
 "Keep the Change" (General Hospital: Night Shift), an episode of the US TV series General Hospital: Night Shift
 Keep the Change (film), a 1992 TV film starring William Petersen, adapted from a novel by Thomas McGuane
 Keep the Change (2018 film), a 2018 American romantic comedy film
 Keep the Change, a novel by Thomas McGuane
 "Keep the Change", a 2009 song by Holly Williams from the album Here with Me
 "Keep the Change", a 2010 song by Darryl Worley
 "Keep the Change", a 2011 song by Hank Williams Jr.

See also 
 Tip (gratuity)